The 2008 Florida Atlantic Owls baseball team will be the intercollegiate baseball team of Florida Atlantic University.  It competes on the Division I level in the Sun Belt Conference.  The 2008 team marked the second season of baseball to compete in the Sun Belt, after Florida Atlantic joined the conference after the 2006 season.  On Thursday, April 24, 2008 Coach Kevin Cooney announced that the 2008 season would be his last season as head coach of the Owls.  With his retirement announcement, Cooney will leave the Owls after 21 years as head coach.  Up to this point, in 28 years of existence, Florida Atlantic baseball had had only two coaches, Steve Traylor and Kevin Cooney.

2008 schedule and results

External links
 Sun Belt Conference Baseball Statistics
 Official FAU Owls Baseball Homepage 
 NCAA Baseball National Polls

Florida Atlantic Owls baseball seasons
Florida Atlantic